The Taranaki Waste Lands Board was constituted under the Taranaki Waste Lands Act 1874 to manage the sale of confiscated Māori land.  

The Board commenced proceedings in January 1875, chaired by Charles Douglas Whitcombe, Taranaki Commissioner of Crown Lands, with William Morgan Crompton, Thomas Kelly, Arthur Standish, and William Neilson Syme standing as members. It oversaw the establishment of the town of Inglewood on 23 January, in the Moa district, and held its first land sale on 20 February that year. Jones and McMillan.

In 1877, A. Cracroft Fookes was sold  on the Mountain Road for the purpose of forming the Midhirst Special Settlement.  The Board authorised the surveying of a new town on the banks of the Patea River on 11 June 1877, and gave it the name Stratford in December that year, when it also authorised the surveying of Waipuku village.

References

 The History of Taranaki: A Standard Work on the History of the Province by Benjamin Wells, 1878, Edmondson & Avery, New Plymouth, New Zealand.

External links
Facsimile of the Taranaki Waste Lands Act 1874

History of Taranaki